The 1972 season was the 67th season of competitive football in Norway.

Viking FK won the title on goal difference with Fredrikstad FK finishing runners-up, while Jan Erik Osland's goal gave SK Brann a 1–0 win over Rosenborg BK in the Norwegian cup final.

Men's football

League season

Promotion and relegation

1. divisjon

Viking FK won the championship, their second league title.

2. divisjon

Group A

Group B

District IX–X

District XI

3. divisjon

Norwegian Cup

Final

Source:

UEFA competitions

European Cup

First round

|}

European Cup Winners' Cup

First round

|}

UEFA Cup

First round

|}

Second round

|}

National team

Results 
Source:

References

 
Seasons in Norwegian football